Grand Prince Hoean (회안대군) (2 July 1364 – 10 April 1421), personal name Yi Bang-gan (이방간), was royal prince during the early Joseon Dynasty. He is the fourth son of King Taejo and Queen Sinui.

Life 
In 1364, Yi Bang-gan was in Hamgyong Province as the fourth son of Yi Seong-gye and Lady Han, of the Cheongju Han clan.

Firstly, he will marry Lady Min, daughter of Min Seon (민선).The couple had only one son. His second wife was Lady Hwang, daughter of Hwang Hyeong (황형), with whom he had four children (1 son and 3 daughters).

Lasty, he married Lady Geum, daughter of Geum In-bae (금인배). Yi Bang-gan had two more sons with his third wife.

After killing Jeong Do-jeon and Nam Eun , Bang-won's only rival for the throne was his elder brother Yi Bang-gan. Jeongjong of Joseon had no sons to succeed him and planned on passing the throne to Yi Bang-won.Prince Hoean became jealous of his younger brother, Yi Bang-won, and led a coup d'etait against him. Both princes grew personal armies in secret. Yi Bang-won was able to defeat his brother's army. After the coup, Prince Hoean was exiled and his supporters were killed. This became known as the Second Strife of Princes.

Family 
Parents

 Father: Taejo of Joseon (조선 태조; 4 November 1335 – 27 June 1408) 
 Paternal Grandfather: King Hwanjo of Joseon (조선 환조) (1315 – 1 January 1361)
 Paternal Grandmother: Queen Uihye of the Yeongheung Choe clan (의혜왕후 최씨)
 Mother: Queen Sinui of the Cheongju Han clan (신의왕후 한씨) (September 1337 – 21 October 1391)
 Maternal Grandfatther: Han Gyeong, Internal Prince Ancheon (한경 안천부원군)
 Maternal Grandmother: Grand Lady of Samhan State of the Saknyeong Shin clan (삼한국대부인 삭녕 신씨)

Consorts and their Respective Issue(s):

 Internal Princess Consort Min of the Yeoheung Min clan (삼한국대부인 여흥민씨)
 Yi Maeng-jung, Prince Uiryeong (의령군 이맹중) (15 February 1385 - 11 July 1423), first son
 Internal Princess Consort Hwang of the Miryang Hwang clan (삼한국대부인 밀양 황씨)
 Yi Tae, Prince Changnyeong (창녕군 이태) (1389 - 15 October 1451), second son
 Princess Seonghye (성혜옹주) (? - 1431), first daughter
 Princess Shinhye (신혜옹주), second daughter
 Princess Yanghye (양혜옹주), third daughter
 Princess Consort Geumreung of the Gimpo Geum clan (금릉부부인 김포 금씨)
 Yi Seon, Prince Geumseong (금성군 이선) (1409 – ?), third son
 Yi Jong-gun, Prince Geumsan (금산군 이중군) (9 February 1413 – 18 September 1478), fourth son
 Concubine Park, of the Chuncheon Park clan  (춘천 박씨)
 Concubine Baekjong (백종)

In popular culture 

 Portrayed by Kim Joo-young in the 1983 KBS TV series Foundation of the Kingdom.
 Portrayed by Kim Joo-young  in the 1996–1998 KBS TV series Tears of the Dragon.
 Portrayed by Kang Shin-hyo in the 2015–2016 SBS TV series Six Flying Dragons.

References 

1364 births
1421 deaths
Joseon dynasty